Danica Maksimović, Aljoša Vučković, Irfan Mensur, Ružica Sokić, Ivan Bekjarev, Bojana Ordinačev, Srđan Karanović, Iva Štrljić, Srna Lango, Dragana Vujić & Vladan Dujović joins the cast.

Plot

After thirteen years Vuk returns to Serbia to clear his name and see his love Jelena. Jelena is now married for Ratko, Vuk's nemesis and they have two children, Saša and Lidija. Vuk opens corporation "Stigma" and his right hand is Tatjana Pantić. Vuk brought to Serbia his daughter Helen too. Vuk meet his old friend Petar. In Jelena's and Ratko's house works maid Mira and Ratko has lawyer Momir.

Cast

Episodes

Jelena (TV series)